Trần Quốc Ân (fl. 1944) was a Vietnamese painter who studied in the 1944–1945 class at EBAI, Hanoi.

References

20th-century Vietnamese painters
Year of birth missing